Honmoyausha is a former Chumashan settlement in Los Angeles County, California.

It was located at El Barranco near San Pedro Bay -  modern-day San Pedro.

Notes

Chumash populated places
Former settlements in Los Angeles County, California
Former populated places in California